Two ships of the Turkish Navy have been named TCG Kılıç Ali Paşa:

She was sold to the Turkish Navy in 1959 and renamed Kılıç Ali Paşa, and decommissioned in 1970.
She was sold to the Turkish Navy in 1980 and renamed Kılıç Ali Paşa, and decommissioned in 1987.

Turkish Navy ship names